FC Zagorets (ФК Загорец) is a Bulgarian football club based in Nova Zagora, currently playing in the Third League, the third tier of Bulgarian football league system. 

The club was founded in 1922 as FC Trakiets. They play their home games at the 5,900-capacity Stadion Zagorets. Their highest finishing position were in 1982–83, ending the season in 3rd place in B Group, the second tier of Bulgarian football.

Honours
Second League:
 3rd place (1): 1982-83
Southeastern Third League:
 Winners (1): 2016–17
Bulgarian Cup:
 Quarter-finals (1): 1948
Cup of Bulgarian Amateur Football League:
 Winners (1): 2019–20

Current squad 
As of 1 August 2020

Notable players
  Kostadin Stoyanov
  Plamen Krumov

Past seasons

League positions

External links
bgclubs.eu

Football clubs in Bulgaria
1922 establishments in Bulgaria
Association football clubs established in 1922